Rosedale is an unincorporated community and census-designated place in Baltimore County, Maryland, United States. The population was 19,257 at the 2010 United States Census.

History 
The origin of the name Rosedale is not documented with certainty. However, a 1950 fourth grade class was told to interview family and friends about the history of the Rosedale community. From that activity came an explanation. A young Englishman had a farm on Hamilton Avenue just above Philadelphia Road. His farm had numerous roses. Since his name was Dale and the roses were so lovely, the townspeople settled on the name of Rosedale.

Rosedale, a community northeast of the city of Baltimore, was a plantation and later farming community, from the time of the first settlers and their slaves, until suburban development began after World War II. Maryland Route 7, which runs through the community, was originally the Philadelphia Road. George Washington traveled it to New York in 1789 where he was inaugurated as the first American president.

In the latter part of the nineteenth century, this area was settled by new waves of immigrants, mostly from Germany and Poland. A 1940 article was written about the 59th wedding anniversary of Charles Schatzschneider and his wife; they had been immigrants who settled in this area. Charles Schatzschneider was born in Germany in 1859 and came at the age of 13 to the United States as a farm laborer. He settled in Rosedale, where he later married. He and his wife raised 15 children. During their lives they saw the area develop from a rather primitive rural community to one with gas and electric lighting, water and sewerage systems and paved streets. New electric trains passed rapidly through the community. When this couple had first come to the area, great three-masted schooners could sail all the way up Back River to the heading.

On 8 March 1909, a man named William Ramsey was lynched in the town. The first school, a wooden building with two rooms, was built on the corner of Hamilton Avenue and Philadelphia Road. By 1950 it was used as a fire house and hall.

Beginning in the 1950s, aided by federal subsidies of new highways, new residential development was built in the suburbs of Baltimore and other major cities. Rosedale grew steadily as a residential suburb. Three quarters of the housing units existing in 1990 were built between 1854 and 1979.

 Source: Rosedale Library  Mary Bennett (Henry) (goofy) 3/16/2020

Education
Baltimore County Public Schools operates public schools.

The following public schools serve the Rosedale community:

Overlea High School
Rosedale Center
Golden Ring Middle School
Red House Run Elementary School
McCormick Elementary School
Shady Spring  School

Private schools:
St. Clement Mary Hofbauer Catholic School
Kingdom Academy
GLA Academy
Baltimore White Marsh Seventh-Day Adventist School
Rosedale Baptist School

Geography
Rosedale is located at  (39.328307, −76.511100).

Demographics

2010 census
As of the census of 2010, there were 19,257 people, 7,128 households, and 5,047 families living in the CDP. The racial makeup of the CDP was 59% White, 33% African American, 0.5% Native American, 3% Asian, 0.1% Pacific Islander, 2.5% from other races, and 2.0% from two or more races. Hispanic or Latino of any race were 5.0% of the population.

There were 7,272 households, out of which 27.1% had children under the age of 18 living with them, 16.9% had a female householder with no husband present, and 29.2% were non-families. 21.8% of all households were made up of individuals, and 10.8% had someone living alone who was 65 years of age or older. The average household size was 2.70 and the average family size was 3.17.

The median income for a household in the CDP was $62,534, and the median income for a family was $74,212. Males had a median income of $51,922 versus $40,314 for females. The per capita income for the CDP was $29,608. About 5.6% of families and 7.5% of the population were below the poverty line, including 16% of those under age 18 and 3.6% of those age 65 or over.

2000 census
As of the census of 2000, there were 19,199 people, 7,272 households, and 5,330 families living in the CDP. The racial makeup of the CDP was 74.71% White, 21.20% African American, 0.24% Native American, 1.91% Asian, 0.06% Pacific Islander, 0.52% from other races, and 1.36% from two or more races. Hispanic or Latino of any race were 1.39% of the population.

In 2000, 2.7% of Rosedale residents identified as being of Greek heritage. This was the highest percentage of Greek Americans of any place in Maryland.

There were 7,272 households, out of which 30.1% had children under the age of 18 living with them, 54.0% were married couples living together, 14.2% had a female householder with no husband present, and 26.7% were non-families. 21.8% of all households were made up of individuals, and 10.3% had someone living alone who was 65 years of age or older. The average household size was 2.64 and the average family size was 3.07.

In the CDP, the population was spread out, with 23.8% under the age of 18, 7.6% from 18 to 24, 28.2% from 25 to 44, 23.9% from 45 to 64, and 16.6% who were 65 years of age or older. The median age was 39 years. For every 100 females, there were 91.2 males. For every 100 females age 18 and over, there were 88.5 males.

The median income for a household in the CDP was $47,801, and the median income for a family was $52,925. Males had a median income of $36,218 versus $29,278 for females. The per capita income for the CDP was $20,243. About 3.8% of families and 5.4% of the population were below the poverty line, including 6.6% of those under age 18 and 5.4% of those age 65 or over.

Transportation

Roads
Some major roads in Rosedale are:
Franklin Square Drive
Golden Ring Road (MD 588)
Hamilton Avenue
Hazelwood Avenue
Kenwood Avenue (MD 588)
Lillian Holt Drive
Philadelphia Road (MD 7)
Pulaski Highway (US 40)
Rossville Boulevard

Notable people
 Stacy Keibler, former Baltimore Ravens cheerleader, professional wrestling diva and wrestler for the WWE (2001–2006), and actress
 Mike Rowe, American actor and voice-over artist
 Wayne Schafer, Pitmaster Big Fat Daddy's stand.
 Christi Shake, Playboy model

See also

 2011 Rosedale, Maryland beating

References

Census-designated places in Baltimore County, Maryland
Census-designated places in Maryland
Greek-American culture in Maryland
Maryland populated places on the Chesapeake Bay